Ronald Watson Henley (born December 5, 1956 in Houston, Texas) is an American chess grandmaster, writer, narrator and producer of chess videos, as well as financial funding trader.

Professional career
As President of RWH Advisors, Henley acts as Special Consultant to Ultra High Net Worth Individuals and Family Offices.

From 1985 through 2001, Henley was an American Stock Exchange Member, as a trader, market maker and specialist. Henley traded extensively in Phillip Morris, Wells Fargo and Teva Pharmaceuticals.

From 2001 to 2005, Henley was a founding partner and Head Trader of a statistical arbitrage family of hedge funds, with clients such as Bank of America, Gottex Fund of Funds and Aegon USA Insurance Company.

Henley is an International Registered Financial Consultant, and went into business consulting where he joined the Board of Directors of several private companies including Quantum Genomics. Henley is currently a member of the financial trading industry.

Henley has made presentations at several conferences in the financial industry, including 
 LightHouse Hedge Fund Conference 2003 
 GAIM 2010
 Raleigh NC 2010

Playing career

Grandmaster title
Henley was awarded the International Master title in 1980, and the Grandmaster title in 1982. Henley appeared on the cover of Chess Life in 1982, representing the United States. He earned the GM title while finishing equal first with Walter Browne in a 26-player round-robin tournament in Surakarta/Denpasar, Indonesia, defeating Grandmaster Tony Miles in the last round.

Henley was appointed by Garry Kasparov and Anatoly Karpov as President of the World Chess Champions Council Inc, a New York nonprofit organization that promotes chess in schools.

Champion chess trainer
Henley has been a second, analyst and trainer for former World Chess Champion Anatoly Karpov in several matches in the 1990s.

Henley has served as a chess trainer and promoter of leading young women chess players, including Three Time US Women's Chess Champion Irina Krush.

Chess publishing

Online chess videos
In 2012, Henley was invited to join National Master William Stewart for the educational website called 'OnlineChessLessons'. Henley provides skills as a chess analyst to an international audience.

Chess DVDs
Henley narrated the double-volume chess video, "American Chess Princesses". In this video, Irina Krush, Elina Groberman, Laura Ross and Shirley Ben-Dak present some of their best games from the 1997 FIDE World Youth Chess Championships held in Cannes, France. In the late 1990s, Henley founded the site www.ChessSuperstore.com, which sponsored Irina Krush and Hikaru Nakamura.

Chess books
 Elista Diaries: Karpov-Kamsky, Karpov-Anand, Anand Mexico City 2007 World Chess Championship Matches (with Anatoly Karpov) 
 Archangel!: A Defense Against the Ruy Lopez 
 The King's Indian Attack! 
 The Spanish Exchange! 
 The Dragon!: Powerplay 
 The ChessBase University BlueBook Guide to Winning with The King's Indian Attack! 
 Crushing White: The Dzindzi Indian! Volume 1:

References

External links
 
 
 
 
 
 About Grandmaster Ron W. Henley
 

1956 births
Living people
American chess players
American chess writers
American male non-fiction writers
Chess grandmasters
Chess arbiters
People from Houston
Lamar High School (Houston, Texas) alumni